Kanamienamides is a complex enol ether containing enamide that is currently undergoing research in regards to its inhibitory activity towards cancer cells. The synthesis of kanamienamide consists of several chemical techniques, including CBS asymmetric reduction, Stork-Zhao-Wittig olefination, Cu-mediated amide coupling with vinyl iodide, Evans asymmetric alkylation, and ring-closing metathesis. Kanamienamide is a natural product found in Moorea bouillonii which is a cyanobacterium.

References

Heterocyclic compounds with 1 ring
Nitrogen heterocycles
Oxygen heterocycles
Amides
Methoxy compounds